Christopher Hale (born January 4, 1966) is a former professional American football defensive back in the  National Football League.

Playing career
Hale played college football for the Nebraska Cornhuskers and the USC Trojans. He was drafted by the Buffalo Bills in the 7th round (193rd overall) of the 1989 NFL Draft. He played four seasons for the Buffalo Bills.

References

1966 births
Living people
People from Monrovia, California
Players of American football from California
Sportspeople from Los Angeles County, California
American football defensive backs
Nebraska Cornhuskers football players
USC Trojans football players
Buffalo Bills players